Thompson Township is one of twenty-three townships in Jo Daviess County, Illinois, USA.  As of the 2010 census, its population was 841 and it contained 1,036 housing units.

Geography

Cemeteries
The township contains Thompson Cemetery.

Airports and landing strips
 Apple Canyon Lake Airport (historical).

Demographics

School districts
 River Ridge Community Unit School District 210.
 Scales Mound Community Unit School District 211.
 Stockton Community Unit School District 206.
 Warren Community Unit School District 205.

Political districts
 Illinois' 17th congressional district.
 State House District 89.
 State Senate District 45.

References
 
 United States Census Bureau 2007 TIGER/Line Shapefiles.
 United States National Atlas.

External links
 Jo Daviess County official site.
 City-Data.com.
 Illinois State Archives.
 Township Officials of Illinois.

Townships in Jo Daviess County, Illinois
Townships in Illinois